The Cincinnati Fire Department provides fire protection and emergency medical services for Cincinnati, Ohio. The department, which was established on April 1, 1853, was the first fully paid and professional fire department in the United States.

History
The Cincinnati Fire Department became the first professional, paid fire department in the United States on April 1, 1853. Miles Greenwood, who co-invented the first steam fire engine, became the department's first chief after a fire in 1852 at Greenwood's Eagle Ironworks, destroyed much of his business. The fire inspired Greenwood to find new and better ways to fight fires.

Stations and apparatus 
Complete list of stations and apparatus.

References

External links
 Cincinnati Fire Dept History and Photos
 Cincinnati Fire Department Official Website
 Cincy Fire Apparatus Cincinnati page

Organizations based in Cincinnati
Fire departments in Ohio
Government of Cincinnati
Government agencies established in 1853
1853 establishments in Ohio